Econsave is a supermarket chain in Malaysia owned by Econsave Cash & Carry Sdn. Bhd. It was founded in 1955 by the Lai family as a sundry store in Klang, Selangor. Econsave is also known to manufacture "Econsave" and "E&S" branded goods.

As of 2021, Econsave is the largest chain of supermarket/hyper market in Malaysia with over 90 branches  peninsula Malaysia, Sabah and Sarawak. A significant portion of the locations are located in peninsula Malaysia with growing presence in Sabah and Sarawak.

History

The history of Econsave began with a wooden sundry shop in Port Klang more than 60 years ago. In the home state of Selangor, Econsave has the largest and most extensive network of branches in all the main towns in Malaysia .

See also
 List of hypermarkets
 List of supermarkets in Malaysia

References

External links 
 

1955 establishments in Malaya
Hypermarkets
Supermarkets of Malaysia
Privately held companies of Malaysia